E.T. Adventure is a dark ride located at Universal Studios Florida in Orlando, Florida, United States. Primarily designed in-house by Universal Creative in collaboration with Steven Spielberg, the ride first opened to the public at Universal Studios Florida in 1990. Similar installations of the ride opened at Universal Studios Hollywood in 1991 and Universal Studios Japan in 2001, both of which have since been removed.

E.T. Adventure recreates the flying-bicycle chase scene from the 1982 film E.T. the Extra-Terrestrial, while introducing E.T.'s homeworld, the Green Planet, featured in the sequel novel E.T.: The Book of the Green Planet. Many of the ride's animatronics and exotic plants were designed and manufactured by Sally Corporation.

History
In 1989, following the success of Earthquake: The Big One at Universal Studios Hollywood, which left a positive impression on Steven Spielberg, work began on a new attraction to be based on his 1982 film E.T. the Extra-Terrestrial. Universal Vice President and Executive Producer Peter Alexander worked closely with Spielberg and led Universal Creative in the creation of the dark ride attraction. Alexander found the task challenging, saying that the "emotional impact" of a two-hour-long film is "not easily translated into six or eight minute theme park rides". After suggesting that the chase scene from the film could transition into a voyage through E.T.'s homeworld, the Green Planet, Spielberg liked the idea but emphasized the importance of keeping the story "personal". He said guests should have a "personal moment" with E.T., and that the Green Planet should be depicted as a "friendly place".

Following Spielberg's advice, the scenes depicting the Green Planet were designed to be both "alien" and "friendly". Inspiration was drawn from E.T.: The Book of the Green Planet, a novel by William Kotzwinkle in 1985 that serves as a written sequel to the 1982 film. The character Botanicus and the shape of E.T.'s home featured in the attraction were directly influenced by the book, as were the many plant-like creatures. Alexander also channeled his childhood experiences with coral reefs off the coast of California, which he recalled had the appearance of an "alien landscape". Underwater plant research was conducted and used by art directors to also aid in plant design. Sally Corporation was brought in to assist, designing and manufacturing over 300 animatronics and plants.

To create the personal encounter in the ride's finale, Universal worked with Birket Engineering to design an animatronic E.T. that could say goodbye to each guest by name as they passed by. The system could recognize as many as 20,000 names, which each guest would supply to a ride attendant earlier in the line queue.

The completed ride opened as E.T. Adventure during the grand opening of Universal Studios Florida in 1990. Another instance of the ride opened at Universal Studios Hollywood in 1991, followed by a third at Universal Studios Japan in 2001. The Hollywood version closed on March 14, 2003, and was replaced by Revenge of the Mummy: The Ride. The Japanese installation closed on May 10, 2009, and was replaced by Space Fantasy: The Ride. The E.T. Adventure in Orlando became the last remaining in operation and later received a refurbishment in 2017. An E.T. Adventure was expected to open at Universal Studios South Korea in 2021, but plans for the theme park were scrapped.

In 2012, the ride at Universal Studios Florida received new track switches by Dynamic Structures.

Ride description

Cast
 Steven Spielberg as himself (pre-show video)
 Pat Welsh as E.T., Tikerly, Magdoll (voices)
 Ron Knight as Botanicus, Vorpdar, NASA scientist, radiation patrolman, sheriffs (voices)

Exterior queue
The building housing E.T. Adventure at Universal Studios Florida, along with portions of its exterior line queue, are themed to a sound stage where E.T. is being filmed. TV monitors overhead display E.T. trivia as well as clips of various film crew members discussing their experiences during the production of the film. Posters of the film's 30th Anniversary re-release, in English and various other languages, are on display near the end of the exterior queue where the pre-show takes place.

Pre-show
Before entering the interior queue, Steven Spielberg appears on several overhead TV screens telling guests that E.T.'s teacher Botanicus has asked E.T. to return to his home world, the Green Planet, because life there is dying. Only E.T.'s magical healing touch can save the planet and its inhabitants, so it is up to the guests to bring him home. Spielberg describes that guests will make their journey on bikes, as a ride vehicle is shown on screen. He also explains the need for guests to give their name to one of his "assistants", and in return they will receive an "interplanetary passport". The passport is a card containing a barcode that corresponds to the name given, entered by a ride attendant into a computer; an E.T. animatronic will speak each name later in the ride's finale. Following the pre-show video, entrance doors automatically open revealing another room where guests will receive their passport cards before venturing into the interior queue.

Prior to the ride's refurbishment in 2002 celebrating the film's 20th anniversary, the pre-show displayed a different video with Spielberg telling guests they were being cast as actors in new scenes inspired by the original film. The passports were instead described as "passes" that allowed access on set, and ride attendants were referred to as "stagehands".

Interior queue
Inside is a dark forest setting filled with redwood trees, reminiscent of the scene in the film where E.T. is trying to evade police capture, along with the smell of pine that fills the queue. An animatronic Botanicus periodically emerges from behind a thick plume of fog and lighting effects, pleading for E.T.'s return. Along the line queue, guests pass by the communication device E.T. constructed in the film to phone home, complete with a Speak & Spell prop that displays the letters H-E-L-P E-T one a time. Somewhat more hidden within the queue is an animatronic rabbit, referencing the one that appears in the film's opening. Another rare sighting is a visual of E.T.'s glowing red heart moving through the trees, simulating a run through the forest. The queue ends at the loading platform where guests board ride vehicles.

Ride
Each individual seat is a bicycle, whose handles come down as the lap bars. The bike in the middle of the front row contains E.T. However, in the attraction's early years, guests also had the option of riding in a spaceship modeled after the one that E.T. came to Earth on in the movie; these ride vehicles were removed as guests preferred to ride the bikes, given how iconic they were in the famous flying scene in the movie.

The vehicles travel past NASA and police officials who give chase and try to arrest the riders and capture E.T. As they are about to be caught, a police car appears out of nowhere and just as they are about to hit it, the bicycles begin to fly over the city and then into outer space. From their bikes, the guests can see a miniature city below, including real moving cars and even a football stadium and two baseball fields.

The bikes are then transported to a kind of portal area with flashing lights which, when finally turned around, arrive at the Green Planet. The guests then encounter Botanicus, who urges the visitors to save E.T.'s friends.

E.T.'s healing touch travels through the Green Planet, reviving his friends and beginning a celebration with numerous baby E.T.s frolicking and playing. This lasts for about 3 minutes and is a huge contrast to the beginning; the beginning is dark and scary while this part of the ride is light and colorful, with spurting water and singing. At the end, the guests pass an animatronic E.T. (voiced by Pat Welsh) who thanks them all by the names that they gave to the travel agents/Spielberg's assistants. Then, in a flash of light, guests are sent back to Earth and into the unload area. As guests leave the ride, they can sometimes hear E.T.'s voice reminding them, "I'll be right here."

Incidents
On January 31, 2019, an 11-year-old boy was injured on the ride after his foot and a portion of his leg became stuck between the moving vehicle and the cement boarding platform. A lawsuit was filed by the boy's mother seeking $15,000 in damages, claiming that multiple bones were broken requiring surgery.

See also
 
 List of amusement rides based on film franchises

References

External links
 E.T. Adventure at Universal Orlando Resort
 E.T. Adventure at Universal Studios Japan
 E.T. Adventure at Orlando Rocks

Amusement rides introduced in 1990
Amusement rides introduced in 1992
Amusement rides introduced in 2001
Amusement rides that closed in 2003
Amusement rides that closed in 2009
Amusement rides manufactured by Sally Corporation
Adventure
Sally Corporation animatronics
Universal Studios Hollywood
Universal Studios Florida
Universal Studios Japan
Universal Parks & Resorts attractions by name
Amusement rides based on film franchises
Animatronic attractions
Former Universal Studios Hollywood attractions
Outer space in amusement parks
1990 establishments in Florida